Jöns Svanberg (1771–1851) was a Swedish clergyman and natural scientist.

Life 

He was born on 6 July 1771 in Ytterbyn, Sweden and died on 15 January 1851 in Uppsala, Sweden.

Career 

He entered Uppsala University at the age of 16. He received his Ph.D. in 1794. In 1806, he became the professor of surveying and in 1811 he became the professor of mathematics at Uppsala University.

In 1798, he became a member of the Royal Swedish Academy of Sciences. From 1803 to 1811, he was the secretary of the Royal Swedish Academy of Sciences. In 1822, Svanberg was elected a member of the American Philosophical Society in Philadelphia.

Works

Honours 

He was the founder of Upsala Simsällskap, the Uppsala swimming society. The mountain Svanbergfjellet is named after him.

References

External links 
 http://www.geni.com/people/J%C3%B6ns-Svanberg/371099020080013971

1771 births
1851 deaths
Swedish scientists
People from Vaxholm Municipality
Uppsala University alumni
Academic staff of Uppsala University
Members of the Royal Swedish Academy of Sciences
Burials at Uppsala old cemetery
Recipients of the Lalande Prize
Members of the Royal Society of Sciences in Uppsala